Georgi Georgiev (born 18 July 1951) is a Bulgarian rower. He competed at the 1976 Summer Olympics and the 1980 Summer Olympics.

References

1951 births
Living people
Bulgarian male rowers
Olympic rowers of Bulgaria
Rowers at the 1976 Summer Olympics
Rowers at the 1980 Summer Olympics
Place of birth missing (living people)